Kumyazy (Qomyaźı) is a rural locality (a village) in Starobaltachevsky Selsoviet, Baltachevsky District, Bashkortostan, Russia. The population was 532 as of 2010. There are 7 streets.

Geography 
Kumyazy is located 6 km east of Starobaltachevo (the district's administrative centre) by road. Starobaltachevo is the nearest rural locality.

References 

Rural localities in Baltachevsky District